Eden Mark Bailey (born 4 February 2004) is an English professional footballer who plays as a forward for  club Hanley Town, on loan from  club Altrincham.

Bailey made his competitive debut at Port Vale in August 2021, though was released at the end of the 2021–22 season following a short loan spell with Newcastle Town. He signed with Altrincham in November 2022 and was loaned out to Hanley Town.

Career

Port Vale
Bailey began his career at Port Vale at the age of eight, and was named as Youth Player of the Year for the 2020–21 season. He made his first-team debut on 10 August 2021, coming on as a 75th-minute substitute for James Wilson in a 2–1 defeat to Sunderland in an EFL Cup first round fixture at Vale Park. He made his League Two debut as a substitute in a 2–1 defeat at Newport County on 11 December. On 12 March 2022, he joined Newcastle Town of the Northern Premier League Division One West on an initial one-month loan deal; he made his debut for Castle later that day in a 2–0 home defeat to Bootle. Port Vale youth team manager Billy Paynter said that "he played on the left of a three and was a threat, he had a very good game" and had recovered well from an ankle injury that had kept him out of action for two months earlier in the season. On 19 March, he scored his first career goal with a header 12 minutes into a 2–2 draw at Mossley. He played a total of nine games for Newcastle. He was not offered a professional contract when his youth-team contract expired in June 2022.

Altrincham
On 17 November 2022, Bailey signed for National League club Altrincham, immediately joining Hanley Town of the Northern Premier League Division One West on loan until the end of the 2022–23 season. Altrincham manager Phil Parkinson said that he had "a real diamond on our hands".

Style of play
Bailey has been described by Altrincham manager Phil Parkinson as "a modern-day centre-forward" who can "hold the ball up, run the channels and, most importantly, score goals".

Personal life
His grandfather, Terry Bailey, played professionally for Port Vale in the 1970s and his father, Mark Bailey, played professionally for Rochdale, Lincoln City and Macclesfield Town.

Career statistics

References

2004 births
Living people
English footballers
Footballers from Stoke-on-Trent
Association football forwards
Port Vale F.C. players
Newcastle Town F.C. players
Altrincham F.C. players
Hanley Town F.C. players
English Football League players
Northern Premier League players
National League (English football) players